Mads Max Ibenfeldt (born 26 January 1985) is a retired Danish professional footballer who played as a defender.

References

External links

1985 births
Living people
Danish men's footballers
Association football midfielders
Silkeborg IF players
Boldklubben af 1893 players
Brønshøj Boldklub players
Akademisk Boldklub players
Southend United F.C. players
English Football League players

Association football defenders
IF Skjold Birkerød players